France Bleu Touraine (98.7 FM) is a French regional radio station owned by Radio France under the France Bleu network. It broadcasts to the Indre-et-Loire region as well as Loché-sur-Indrois, with the cities of Tours and Orléans in its coverage area.

Generally, the radio broadcasts news, usually regional, but it can also be about sports, culture, recent events, etc. It is a generalist channel. It also has its own flagship channels, available to view on their programming schedule.

References 

Radio stations in France
Radio France
1988 establishments in France
Radio stations established in 1988